Purity is the second album by Ukrainian black metal band Hate Forest, released in 2003.

Track listing

References

2003 albums
Osmose Productions albums
Hate Forest albums